John Barbee Minor (1813–1895) was an American jurist and slaveowner. He practiced law in Virginia and then taught at the University of Virginia School of Law for fifty years. His students achieved eminence in professional or public lives. Some referred to his teaching career as not only the longest but the ablest known to Anglo-Saxon jurisprudence, and one declared that "he has exerted, and still indirectly exerts, a wider influence for good upon society in the United States than any man who has lived in this generation."

Early years
Born in Louisa County, Virginia on June 2, 1813, to Launcelot Minor and Mary Overton Tompkins, a weakling at sixteen, he began a long, horseback journey through the state as a newspaper agent and collector and then walked to Ohio, where he entered Kenyon College. Two of his classmates there became famous:  David Davis became United States Senator, United States Judge, and administered the estate of President Lincoln; and Edwin M. Stanton became Secretary of War under Lincoln. Afterwards Minor walked through Ohio and New York, for health and recreation, and, having reached home, entered the University of Virginia in January 1831, where he was a student for three sessions, "graduating in several schools", and received the Bachelor of Law degree in 1834, at twenty-one. He later married Martha Macon Davis, the sister of his law instructor Professor John A. G. Davis, in whose home he tutored while pursuing his own studies. (One source describes her as Davis' daughter, but he had no daughter of the name Martha.) He had so overcome his physical weakness that he could endure almost unlimited labor, and developed "an impressive stature and presence."

John "John" Barbee Minor was related to the Berkley, Maury, Dabney, Herndon, Byrd, Page, and many other Virginia families and was a close friend and kinsman to Matthew Fontaine Maury and B. Franklin "Frank" Minor; all three loved to do garden growth experiments for relaxation. They constantly wrote to one another on a variety of subjects and deeply trusted one another with what they wrote. This is found in their writings that were saved. There is also a Maury Hall and a Dabney Hall close to Minor Hall at the University of Virginia. These families were and still are very close.

Career 
 
Minor began to practice law at Buchanan, in Botetourt county, and after six years moved to Charlottesville, where he formed a partnership with his brother Lucian, who later became Professor of Law at William and Mary.  In 1845, when thirty-two years old, Minor was elected Professor of Law at the University of Virginia, succeeding H. St. George Tucker, and remained the only instructor in that department until 1851. Upon the appointment of James Philemon Holcombe as adjunct professor of Constitutional and International Law, Mercantile Law and Equity, Minor's subjects became Common and Statute Law, in both of which he became an authority.

For his last forty-two years he was an Episcopalian. His religion "was the master chord in his life, the source of that rare union of sweetness and dignity, of gentleness with firmness, that helped to make up his charming personality." For many years he superintended a Sunday school for slaves and also taught a Sunday morning Bible class composed of students, whose last meetings were in their revered teacher's study, after he was unable to walk to the lecture room. During the sectional debates, he advocated the Union. However, after the Civil War started, he backed the Confederate government. Minor served as a guard and an attendant at the Military Hospital in Louisa Court House at the university.

As a teacher Minor was regarded with peculiar affection. Taking a personal interest in his pupils, he endeavored to develop their character as well as their minds. Professor Minor, "a man of stern morality and firm conservative convictions," profoundly influenced James Clark McReynolds, who went on to be attorney general of the United States and a justice of the United States Supreme Court. Future president Woodrow Wilson studied law under Minor in 1879.

Professor Minor continued to inspire and impress for fifty years until his death, July 29, 1895. He is buried at the University of Virginia cemetery.

Contributions to law 

Of his monumental Institutes of Common and Statute Law, Senator Daniel said:  "It cannot be surpassed as a vade mecum of the law; it is like a statue, solid, compact, clean cut; it contains more law in fewer words than any work with which I am acquainted."  The first and second volumes were published in 1875, and the fourth volume in 1878, while the third, which had long been used in pamphlet form by his pupils, was first published in complete form in 1895. In 1870, the professor began a summer course of law lectures, and his is believed to have been the first summer law school in the country. This became widely popular, enrolling more than a hundred students.

In addition to his Institutes, Minor published in 1850, The Virginia Reports, 1799-1800, and in 1894, the elaborate, Exposition of the Law of Crimes and Punishments, which long remained in general use.

Honors 
For his eminent attainments, Minor received the honorary degree of Doctor of Laws from both Washington and Lee and from Columbia. On the fiftieth anniversary as a teacher of the law the University Law Alumni presented him with a life-size marble bust, mounted upon a polished pedestal bearing these impressive words:  "He taught the law and the reason thereof."  James Russell Lowell wrote his obituary, claiming Minor had signed more law diplomas than anyone in the country's history. Minor Hall, occupied by the law school from 1911 to 1932, was named after him. The University of Virginia School of Law established a John B. Minor professorship in Law and History.

Works 
 Minor, John B. A Synopsis of the Law of Crimes and Punishments in Virginia: For the Use of the Students of Law in the University of Virginia. Richmond, Va: M.W. Hazlewood, 1869.
 Minor, John B. Synopsis of the Practice of the Law in Virginia in Civil Cases. Charlottesville, Va., 1874.
 Minor, John B. Institutes of Common and Statute Law. Third edition. Richmond: Printed for the author, 1882. 2 v.
 Minor, John B. Part of the Law of Personal Property: Including the Law of Bankruptcy and the Law of Executors & Administrations. 1888.
 Minor, John B. Synopsis of the Law of Crimes and Punishments. 1890.
 Minor, John B. Exposition of the Law of Crimes and Punishments. Richmond: The author, 1894.
 Minor, John B, and Raleigh C. Minor. University of Virginia: Private Summer Course of Law Lectures, 1895 : Lectures to Commence June 27th, (4th Thursday), and to Continue Two Months. Charlottesville, Va.: 1895.

References

Further reading

External links 
 John Barbee Minor, 1845-1895, The University of Virginia School of Law
 Virginia Teaching: Early Law Professors, The University of Virginia School of Law
 A Guide to the Law lectures of John B. Minor, 1850 circa, A Collection in the Library of Virginia
 The Papers of John B. Minor, 1845-1893, The University of Virginia School of Law

1813 births
1895 deaths
People from Louisa County, Virginia
American people of Dutch descent
American jurists
Kenyon College alumni
University of Virginia School of Law faculty
Burials at the University of Virginia Cemetery
American slave owners
19th-century American lawyers
Minor family